Raven is a village in the municipality of Gostivar, North Macedonia.

History
According to the 1467-68 Ottoman defter, Raven appears as being largely inhabited by an Orthodox Christian Albanian population. Due to Slavicisation, some families had a mixed Slav-Albanian anthroponomy - usually a Slavic first name and an Albanian last name or last names with Albanian patronyms and Slavic suffixes. 

The names are: Gjin, son of Prenush; Pejo, his son; Tana, son of Lazor; Dragoslav, his brother; Dimitri, son of Dushman; Rajko, son of Sotir; Nikolla, son of Prenko; Rajko, son of Sotir; Tan, son of Lazar; Novak, son of Kolesh (Kole-Leshi); Stana, son of Koljesh; Pejo, son of Koljesh; Dimitri, son of Dushman; Bogdan, son of Dushman.

etymology:

The name appears to be another variant of the albanian phrase  “to fall in place” as seen in Tirana and Theranda (modern day Prizren) as most Albanians that came in the village were from mountainous areas that “fell” into the village

During the National Liberation War, an episode was recorded in which Raven's villagers held partisan Macedonians and Albanians in their arms, shouting: "Long live the brotherhood of Macedonians and Albanians."

Demographics
As of the 2021 census, Raven had 1,116 residents with the following ethnic composition:
Albanians 1,077
Persons for whom data are taken from administrative sources 33
Macedonians 2
Others 4

According to the 2002 census, the village had a total of 1615 inhabitants. Ethnic groups in the village include:

Albanians 1611
Macedonians 2
Serbs 1 
Others 1

References

External links

Villages in Gostivar Municipality
Albanian communities in North Macedonia